The Supreme Junta (or Junta Suprema de Caracas) was the institution that governed the Captaincy General of Venezuela following the forced resignation of the Captain General Vicente Emparán on April 19, 1810, marking the beginning of the Venezuelan War of Independence. It lasted until March 2, 1811, when the first constituent congress of the First Republic of Venezuela was established.

Following the events of the Revolution of April 19, 1810, the commanding General and other colonial officials designated by Joseph Bonaparte to oversee the Captaincy General of Venezuela, were deposed by an expanded municipal government in Caracas that called itself: the Supreme Junta to Preserve the Rights of Ferdinand VII (La Suprema Junta Conservadora de los Derechos de Fernando VII).

One of the first measures taken by the revolutionaries, after securing the support of six provinces, was to send diplomatic missions abroad with the hope of gaining support and recognition for the revolution and that of the Supreme Junta of Caracas as the legitimate councillor of Venezuela in the absence of the King. Simon Bolivar along with Luis Lopez Mendez and Andres Bello as secretary, set sail for London from La Guaira in early June 1810.  Juan Vicente Bolívar Palacios, brother of the Liberator, Jose Rafael Revenga and Telesforo Orea sailed for the United States, and had some success in gaining the interest of that country to support the Supreme Junta.

Venezuelan War of Independence
Independence of Venezuela
History of Venezuela